Tyke may refer to:

Tyke (character), an MGM cartoon character in the Tom and Jerry series and the older son of Spike
Tyke (dialect), an English dialect of Northern England spoken in the English county of Yorkshire
Tyke (dog), a dog whose ancestry is generally unknown and that has characteristics of two or more types of breeds
Tyke (elephant), a female circus elephant
Tyke (given name), an American masculine given name
Tyke (pigeon), a Second World War homing pigeon which was awarded the Dickin Medal for gallantry in 1943

See also
Leeds Tykes, a rugby union club, now known as Leeds Carnegie
The Tykes, a nickname for Barnsley F.C.
Tykes Water, a stream that runs north from Aldenham Reservoir to the River Colne
Tyke Invest, company which assist retail investors and founder on Investing & Raising Capital